The 2020 NHRA Drag Racing Series was announced on May 14, 2019.

It was the 65th season of the National Hot Rod Association's top drag racing competition, and scheduled for 24 races.

The season began under the title sponsorship of The Coca-Cola Company, as it had been since 2002. Coca-Cola's Mello Yello brand was once again promoted, as it had been for the previous few years. However, in September 2020 Coca-Cola, which had withheld a sponsorship payment during the NHRA shutdown, announced that it was ending its sponsorship of the series immediately. Since the agreement between the two sides was to run into 2023, the NHRA filed a lawsuit against Coca-Cola.

On October 4, 2020, the NHRA and Camping World CEO Marcus Lemonis announced the two sides had struck a deal for Camping World to immediately assume title sponsorship of the NHRA's top series. This marks the second motorsport series for which Camping World serves as title sponsor, after the NASCAR Camping World Truck Series.

Pandemic Impact on Schedule

Originally scheduled for 24 races, the first Pomona and the Arizona rounds were finished when the impact of the Rudy Gobert incident and the abandonment of The Players Championship FedEx Cup PGA Tour event midway through the first round when the NHRA was 70 air miles away in Gainesville Raceway led to the NHRA revising the schedule as a result of the global pandemic.

On March 25, the NHRA announced the Countdown playoff had been cancelled because of the compressed schedule.  They originally eliminated five races—Atlanta, Richmond, Epping, the first Las Vegas race, and the second Charlotte race while slotting the April Charlotte race into September, and reduced the schedule to 19 races (including the two that had been held) while intending to resume on June 5 with the resumption of the Gatornationals, followed by the SpringNationals in Baytown, Texas.

On May 4, the NHRA announced they were still working with authorities in various states and postponed more races.  While removing one race from the plan, they intended to hold 16 more events in 2020 with an intent to start in August with spectators.  This was announced shortly after NASCAR announced a series of races behind closed doors to resume.

On June 3, the NHRA announced a new revised schedule, with races in Sonoma, Joliet, and Norwalk also cancelled, while returning Commerce to late August.  The NHRA intended to restart July 11 at Lucas Oil Raceway, with spectators permitted, with two Lucas Oil Raceway rounds to restart the season.

On June 25, the King County, Washington authorities cancelled the round at Pacific Raceways in Kent, Washington, as they would have only permitted the event to run behind closed doors. The event would not be held in 2021 either.

After the NHRA season resumed July 11, the NHRA announced on July 17, during the middle of the second Lucas Oil Raceway round, that the Bandimere Speedway round in Colorado and Brainerd International Raceway round in Minnesota had originally been postponed, but later cancelled.  The NHRA replaced all three cancelled rounds with a third consecutive round at Lucas Oil Raceway on August 6–9.  The NHRA in August would then lose the Topeka, Commerce, and Maple Grove Raceway rounds to authorities.

On September 2, 2020, the NHRA released the final schedule where after the fourth consecutive round at Lucas Oil Raceway, the NHRA U.S. Nationals, the remainder of the schedule.  Only two races originally on the schedule for that time of the year were held, in Madison, IL at World Wide Technology Raceway and in Ennis, TX at the Texas Motorplex.  The rescheduled Gatornationals in Gainesville were scheduled in September and the rescheduled Mopar Express Lane SpringNationals in Baytown, TX in late October.  While the NHRA announced the season would conclude in Las Vegas, they cancelled the scheduled Las Vegas round and moved the NHRA Finals, originally set for Pomona, into its place at Las Vegas (the Las Vegas round was officially the Dodge NHRA Finals).

Eleven Top Fuel and Funny Car events, ten NHRA Formula Pro Stock events (with three Non-Championship Mountain Motor Formula events), and ten Pro Stock Motorcycle events were conducted during the season.

Schedule
Schedule released originally on June 2, 2019, but the finalised schedule was released September 2, 2020.

All races scheduled starting July 9 (when the season is scheduled to return after the COVID-19 pandemic) will be held with only two rounds of qualifying, except Lucas Oil Raceway 4 for selected Top Fuel and Funny Car drivers only, which will have three rounds for drivers who had advanced to the final of the abandoned Lucas Oil Raceway 2 event, and Ennis will have up to four rounds for Pro Stock Car and Motorcycle participants only to replace the abandoned Madison, IL event.

There will be two finals held at the fourth Lucas Oil Raceway round (U.S. Nationals).  The first will be held during the third qualifying round Saturday, and only for Top Fuel and Funny Car.  Similarly, the Ennis round will have two finals held, and there will be up to three qualifying rounds Saturday for those Pro Stock Car and Motorcycle entries.

* Finals televised on tape delay.

MM Pro Stock Car at this event is a non-championship race featuring the Mountain Motor formula, which has no engine displacement limit, can use carburetors or electronic fuel injection, and weighs a minimum of 2,450 pounds, compared to the NHRA Pro Stock formula that features electronic fuel injection, a 500ci (8193cc) engine displacement limit, and 2,350 pounds weight.  All two-lane Mountain Motor races will feature eight-car fields.

Additional rules for specially marked races
GVL:  Event started March 12 with some classes finishing on the 14th.  Top Dragster, Top Sportsman, Super Comp, Super Gas, Super Stock, Stock, and Competition Eliminator classes, which had started, were allowed to finish behind closed doors.  The NHRA postponed the Top Fuel, Funny Car, Pro Stock, Pro Stock Motorcycle, Pro Modified, Top Alcohol Dragster, Top Alcohol Funny Car, and Factory Stock Showdown classes to September 25–27.

MM:  Pro Stock Car at this event is a non-championship race with the Mountain Motor formula.  At St. Louis, both NHRA Formula and Mountain Motor will race.

Schedule changes

Removed and merged events
The NHRA removed three races from and merged two races from the original NHRA schedule when the season was suspended during the Gainesville Raceway event as a result of the COVID-19 pandemic.   These events include the following:

Merged
Two venues with two events each had their schedules reduced to one race.

 Las Vegas Motor Speedway:  April 3–5 and October 29-November 1.  Both dates officially cancelled.  The fall date is now home of the relocated Pomona race with those rules in effect as the NHRA World Finals.
 Auto Club Raceway at Pomona:  February 6–9 and November 13–15.  Only the Winternationals was held.  World Finals moved to Las Vegas, which replaced both races with the World Finals.

Cancelled
Thirteen venues lost their NHRA Mello Yello Drag Racing Series events entirely during the 2020 season as a result of the COVID-19 pandemic.  Dates listed in original order.

 zMax Dragway:  April 24–26 and September 25–27.
 Atlanta Dragway:  May 15–17
 Virginia Motorsports Park:  May 29–31 (Track closed by government)
 Heartland Motorsports Park:  June 12–14
 Bristol Motor Speedway:  June 19–21 (Logistics)
 Summit Motorsports Park:  June 25–28 (Track closed by management because of government regulations)
 Route 66 Raceway:  July 10–12 (Track closed by government)
 Bandimere Speedway:  July 17–19 (Track closed by government)
 Sonoma Raceway:  July 24–26 (Track closed by government)
 Pacific Raceways: July 31-August 2 (Track closed by government)
 Brainerd International Raceway:  August 14–16
 New England Dragway:  August 21–23
 Maple Grove Raceway:  September 11–13

Event changes
Races in Charlotte and St. Louis have switched weekends for this year. Scheduling changes made primarily to avoid NASCAR events in some markets.

The only race that does not feature Pro Stock Car will be Indianapolis 2.  Last year, Atlanta did not feature either Pro Stock formula.  The three rounds that will feature Mountain Motor but not the NHRA Pro Stock class are Denver, Brainerd and Atlanta.  St. Louis will feature both NHRA Formula and Mountain Motor.

The NHRA also cancelled the Countdown format owing to the fewer races in 2020.

Final standings

References

External links
 Official website
 Drag Race Central The Latest NHRA News and Analysis

NHRA Camping World Drag Racing Series
2020 in American motorsport
Sports events curtailed due to the COVID-19 pandemic